Milatun (also Romanized as Mīlātūn; also known as Maḩlātīn, Mahlātūn, and Mehlatūn) is a village in Mishan Rural District, Mahvarmilani District, Mamasani County, Fars Province, Iran. At the 2006 census, its population was 81, in 22 families.

References 

Populated places in Mamasani County